This is a list of the world's largest cannabis companies by revenue. The list shows cannabis companies ranked by annual revenue. 

The list includes companies whose primary business activities are associated with cannabis.

Legend

List 
Ranked by total revenues.

See also 
 Cannabis in Canada

References 

Cannabis Companies